V. Senthil Balaji is an Indian politician from Tamil Nadu. He is one of the most successful politicians in India who never lost in any election. He is well known for his election strategy and he was praised by the  Honourable Chief Minister of Tamil Nadu as "Seyal Veerar". Several political parties also titled him as "Election Hero". He is also continuously engaged in several welfare activities through V Senthilbalaji Foundationss and V Senthilbalaji Arakkattalai.

Early life
V Senthil Balaji was born on 21 October 1975 in Rameswarapatti in Karur district. Belongs to Kongu Vellala Gounder community. He hails from an agricultural background. He has completed his high school & Higher Secondary school studies from Rameswarapatti Govt. School, Vivekananda School, Pasupathypalayam and Municipal Higher Secondary school, Karur.  He entered politics at the age of 21 and was active since early 2000s.

Politics 
In 1997 he began his public service as a local body member. He was the Minister for Transport of the Government of Tamil Nadu from 2011 to 2015. He was dropped from cabinet in July 2015. As a cadre of Anna Dravida Munnetra Kazhagam, he was previously elected to the same Karur constituency in 2006 general elections. He was elected as a MLA from Aravakurichi constituency in 2016. After the demise of Jayalalithaa he played a key role in saving the government. When AIADMK separated into factions he stood by T. T. V. Dhinakaran. On 18 September 2017, 18 MLA's were disqualified by the speaker P. Dhanapal for their petition to the Governor Mr. Banwarilal Purohit to change the Chief Minister. He joined Dravida Munnetra Kazhagam (DMK), in the presence of Party President M. K. Stalin on 14 December 2018. Soon after joining the party he was offered District Secretary post and later was announced as by-election candidate for Aravakurichi constituency. He was elected as a MLA on 23 May 2019 for fourth time. He serves as a member of the Tamil Nadu legislative assembly. He won the election held in the month of April 2021 and has been currently serving as Minister for Electricity, Prohibition & Excise.

Electoral performance

References 

Dravida Munnetra Kazhagam politicians
Living people
State cabinet ministers of Tamil Nadu
Year of birth missing (living people)
Tamil Nadu MLAs 2021–2026
Tamil Nadu politicians